Hussein Ali El Shahat Ali Hassan (born 21 June 1992) is an Egyptian footballer who plays for Al Ahly as a winger, he can also play as an attacking midfielder.

Club career 
El Shahat played for Misr Lel-Makkasa from 2014 to 2018, before he joined Al Ain, where he won the 2017–18 UAE Pro League and was runner up at the 2018 FIFA Club World Cup. He scored one goal at the quarterfinals of the latter in a 3–0 win over Espérance Sportive de Tunis.

In January 2019, El Shahat joined Al Ahly. On 4 February 2021, he scored the winning goal for Al Ahly in a 1–0 win over Al-Duhail in the 2020 FIFA Club World Cup.

International career 
He was called up to the Egyptian national team in August 2018, to face Niger in the AFCON qualifying round.

Career statistics

Clubs

International

Honours and achievements
Al Ain
 UAE Pro League: 2017–18
FIFA Club World Cup Runners-up: 2018

Al Ahly
 Egyptian Premier League: 2018–19, 2019–20
 Egypt Cup: 2019–20
 Egyptian Super Cup: 2018, 2021
 CAF Champions League: 2019–20, 2020-21
 CAF Super Cup: 2021 (May), 2021 (December)
 FIFA Club World Cup: Third-Place 2020, Third-Place 2021

References

1992 births
Living people
Egyptian footballers
Place of birth missing (living people)
Egyptian Premier League players
Association football midfielders
Al Ahly SC players
UAE Pro League players
Egyptian expatriate footballers
Expatriate footballers in the United Arab Emirates
Egyptian expatriate sportspeople in the United Arab Emirates
Misr Lel Makkasa SC players
Eastern Company SC players